Carlos Canepa (born 7 March 1943) is a Peruvian former freestyle and butterfly swimmer. He competed in three events at the 1964 Summer Olympics.

References

External links
 

1943 births
Living people
Peruvian male freestyle swimmers
Peruvian male butterfly swimmers
Olympic swimmers of Peru
Swimmers at the 1964 Summer Olympics
Place of birth missing (living people)
20th-century Peruvian people